Typhlochactas reddelli is a species of scorpion in the family Typhlochactidae.

References

Typhlochactidae
Cave arachnids
Animals described in 1968
Endemic scorpions of Mexico